The Peace of Nisibis of 299, also known as the First Peace of Nisibis, was a peace treaty signed in 299 by the Roman and Sasanian empires, and concluded the Roman–Sasanian War of 296–299. The border established as a result of the treaty was maintained until the Second Peace of Nisibis of 363.

The terms of the treaty are known from a 6th-century summary of its content by Peter the Patrician.

Background
During the Roman–Sasanian War of 296–299, despite earlier successes in Mesopotamia, the Sasanian Shah Narseh was defeated by the Roman Caesar Galerius in Armenia in two successive battles. During the second encounter, the Battle of Satala in 298, Roman forces seized Narseh's camp, his treasury, his harem, and his wife. Galerius continued south through Sasanian territory and captured the Sasanian capital, Ctesiphon, before returning to Roman territory.

In 298, Narseh sent his ambassador Apharban to negotiate peace with Galerius and plead for the return of Narseh's family. Apharban was dismissed and told to await an envoy with whom the Sasanians could conclude a treaty. Diocletian and Galerius met at Nisibis in the spring of 299 to discuss the terms of the treaty. Allegedly, Galerius proposed the submission and conquest of the Sasanian Empire, but this was dismissed by Diocletian, whose more moderate terms were adopted and sent to the Sasanians. Sicorius Probus, the magister memoriae, was sent to convey the terms of the treaty to Narseh, who had taken residence in Media.

Treaty
The terms presented by Sicorius Probus included:
Cession of the five satrapies east of the Tigris to the Roman Empire. Several writers offer opposing views on which satrapies were demanded; some argue the satrapies of Ingilene, Sophene, Arzanene, Corduene, and Zabdicene were demanded, whilst others have argued the satrapies of Arzanene, Moxoene, Zabdicene, Rehimene, and Corduene were demanded. 
Recognition of the Tigris as the border between the two empires
Extension of the border of Armenia to the fortress of Zintha in Media Atropatene
Transfer of suzerainty of Iberia to the Roman Empire and relinquishment of the right to appoint the Iberian kings
Establishment of Nisibis as the only legal place of trade between the two empires

According to British historian George Rawlinson, Narseh was surprised by what he felt were moderate demands and agreed to all but the fifth condition of the treaty and it was subsequently withdrawn by Sicorius Probus. Another British historian, Timothy Barnes, gave a different account, noting that Probus stated that he had no authority to revise the agreement, leading Narseh to submit.

Aftermath

After the ratification of the treaty, Diocletian set about building and strengthening fortifications of the Limes Arabicus and Strata Diocletiana along the eastern border of the Roman Empire. Diocletian also increased the number of soldiers stationed along the border.

The treaty ensured peace between the two empires for forty years until the Sasanian invasion of Roman Mesopotamia by Shapur II in the late 330s.

References 

299
Nisibis
Nisibis
Nisibis
Roman–Sasanian Wars
3rd century in Armenia
Ancient history of Georgia (country)
3rd century in Iran
290s in the Roman Empire
Treaties of the Roman Empire